Shur Ab (also Romanized as Shūr Āb and Shoorab) is a village in Kharaqan-e Gharbi Rural District, Central District, Avaj County, Qazvin Province, Iran. At the 2006 census, its population was 232, in 64 families.

References 

Populated places in Avaj County